Weston FC is a soccer club in Weston, Florida competing in the USL League Two. They are also one of the largest soccer clubs in the country for youth soccer.

The club was founded in 1998 as a youth soccer club. They have approximately 1,100 players and 70 teams registered in their youth program, developing several players such as Inter Miami CF player George Acosta. In 2020, they were selected as one of the clubs to join the new MLS Next academy program.

In 2015, Weston added a semi-professional team in the National Premier Soccer League. They moved their team to the Premier Development League in 2017.

Year-by-year

References

USL League Two teams
Association football clubs established in 1998
Soccer clubs in Florida
Weston, Florida
1998 establishments in Florida